Saint-Claude is a commune and a sous-préfecture of the Jura department in the Bourgogne-Franche-Comté region in eastern France. It lies on the river Bienne.

History
The town was originally named Saint-Oyand after Saint Eugendus.  However, when St. Claudius had, in 690, resigned his Diocese of Besançon and had died, in 696, as twelfth abbot, the number of pilgrims who visited his grave was so great that, since the 13th century, the name "Saint-Claude" came more and more into use and has today superseded the other. It was the world capital of wooden smoking pipes crafted by hand from the mid 19th century all the way to the mid 20th century. During WWII the town came under German occupation, yet still remained a haven for Jews escaping to Switzerland due to its close proximity to it (5 miles away from town). As a punishment for the locales consistently assisting and harboring the fleeing Jews, the Nazis executed all the towns males of service age in the town center. There is a memorial plaque in the city square commemorating the event. Today there are several farms and ranches surrounding the town that produce many world famous brands of dairy (Comte cheese), beef (Charolaise), and poultry (Bresse Gauloise).

Population

Transport
Saint-Claude is served by a railway station.

Sport
Saint-Claude has a rugby club.
The 2017 Tour de France passed through Saint-Claude.
The town's close proximity to the forests and ski resorts makes it a popular destination for hiking, mountain biking, camping, and skiing/snowboarding.  Many surrounding lakes (Lac de Vouglans, etc.) also provide numerous fishing and boating activities close to town.

Sights
Saint-Claude Cathedral, former seat of the Bishops of Saint-Claude, is located here.

One of the landmarks in the city is the world largest pipe (7.5 meters long and 8.7 meters high, weighing 600 kg) as a proof of its international reputation as the world capital of pipe manufacturing.

Personalities
Nadir Belhadj, footballer 
Suzanne Belperron (1900-1983), jewelry designer
Angelique Boyer, actress
Mevlüt Erdinç, footballer
Alexis Vuillermoz, cyclist
Maud Forget, actress

See also
Butz-Choquin
Communes of the Jura department

References

External links
 

Communes of Jura (department)
Subprefectures in France